Bethlehem Township is the name of two townships in the U.S. state of Indiana:

 Bethlehem Township, Cass County, Indiana
 Bethlehem Township, Clark County, Indiana

See also
Bethlehem Township (disambiguation)

Indiana township disambiguation pages